Samuel Portugal Lima (born 29 March 1994) is a Brazilian professional footballer who plays as a goalkeeper for Primeira Liga club Porto.

Professional career
On 4 January 2020, Samuel signed with Portimonense from Coritiba. Samuel made his professional debut with Portimonense in a 1-1 Primeira Liga tie with F.C. Paços de Ferreira on 21 September 2020, saving a penalty on his debut.

References

External links
 Profile at the FC Porto website
 
 Fora de Jogo Profile

1994 births
Living people
Sportspeople from Bahia
Brazilian footballers
Association football goalkeepers
Coritiba Foot Ball Club players
Clube Atlético Metropolitano players
Portimonense S.C. players
FC Porto players
Primeira Liga players
Brazilian expatriate footballers
Brazilian expatriate sportspeople in Portugal
Expatriate footballers in Portugal